John Giles Eccardt (1720–1779) was a German-born British portrait painter. He came to England in the company of the French painter Jean-Baptiste van Loo for whom he worked as an assistant. When Van Loo departed the country, Eccardt remained and set up a portrait-painting business. In the following years he did portraits of a number of leading members of British society including twenty six of his chief patron Horace Walpole. He died in 1779.

Gallery

References

External links 

1720 births
1779 deaths
18th-century British painters
British male painters